The following is a timeline of the history of the city of Szczecin, Poland.

Prior to 16th century

 967 - Szczecin became part of Poland under Mieszko I of Poland.
 1121 - Bolesław III Wrymouth in power.
 1124 -  founded.
 ca. 1185 - Ducal mint founded.
 1186 - Stay of the future Polish monarch Władysław III Spindleshanks at the court of Bogusław I, Duke of Pomerania in Szczecin, on behalf of his father, Duke of Greater Poland (and periodically also High Duke of Poland) Mieszko III the Old.
 1243 - Szczecin granted Magdeburg city rights by Duke Barnim I the Good.
 1273 - Wedding of duke of Poznań and future King of Poland Przemysł II with princess Ludgarda, granddaughter of Barnim I, Duke of Pomerania.
 1275 - The city's inhabitants granted the right of free movement in the Principality of Rügen by Slavic Duke of Rügen Vitslav II.
 1277 - The city purchases the villages, present-day districts, Krzekowo and Osów.
 1278 - King Eric V of Denmark exempts the city's inhabitants from customs duties for a fair organised in Zealand, Denmark, along with a promise of peace and protection.
 1284 - The city helps Duke Bogislaw IV to guarantee a peace treaty between the Duchy of Pomerania and the Margraviate of Brandenburg.
 1295 - The city becomes capital of a splinter eponymous duchy under Otto I, and a residential city of Pomeranian dukes.
 1360 - Szczecin becomes part of Hanseatic League.
 1384 -  becomes mayor.
 1478 - The city becomes the capital of the reunified Duchy of Pomerania.

16th to 19th centuries
 1532 - The city becomes again the capital of a splinter eponymous duchy.
 ca. 1532 - Stoppage of minting coins in the local mint.
 1535 - Protestant reformation.
 1570 - Peace treaty, ending the Northern Seven Years' War between Denmark and Sweden signed in the city.
 1577 - Printing press in operation.
 1580 - Resumption of mint work.
 1582 - Ducal Castle rebuilt.
 1606 - Start of reign of Duke Philip II, the greatest patron of the arts among all Pomeranian dukes.
 1625 - Under Bogislaw XIV the city becomes again the capital of the reunited Duchy of Pomerania.
 1630 -  becomes mayor.
 1637 - Death of Bogislaw XIV, the last Pomeranian duke of the House of Griffin.
 1648 - City becomes part of Sweden.
 1654 - Burial of Bogislaw XIV in the Ducal Castle.
 1677 - City taken by Frederick William of Brandenburg.
 1679 - Swedes in power again per Treaty of Saint-Germain-en-Laye.
 1709 - Ducal mint closed down.
 1711 - Stay of King Stanisław Leszczyński in the city.
 1720 - City becomes part of Prussia.
 1721 - French commune founded for the Huguenots, with separate French law and a separate French court.
 1740 -  built.
 1806
 October: Capitulation of Stettin without resistance to France.
 City occupation by French forces begins.
 1809 - French courthouse ceases to exist.
 1813
 Siege by combined Prussian-Russian-Swedish forces.
 December - City occupation by French forces ends.
 1851 - Schiffswerft und Maschinenfabrik Früchtenicht & Brock (shipbuilder) in business in nearby Drzetowo (then Bredow).
 1870–1871 - Prussian prisoner-of-war camp for around 1,700 French soldiers located in the city during the Franco-Prussian War, death of around 600 French soldiers.
 1871 - City becomes part of the German Empire.
 1878 - Hermann Haken (politician) becomes mayor.
 1885 - Population: 99,475.
 1895 - Population: 140,724.
 1898 - Harbour built.

20th century

 1901 - Central Cemetery in Szczecin established.
 1907 -  becomes mayor.
 1909 -  (cinema) opens.
 1919 - Population: 232,726.
 1925 - Consulate of the Republic of Poland opened.
 1939
 Population: 374,017.
 Gemeinschaftslager Tiergarten forced labour camp established by the Germans.
 1940
  begins.
 Merkurlager 4-Am Lenzweg forced labour camp established by the Germans.
 1941 - Gemeinschaftslager Tiergarten forced labour camp dissolved.
 1943 - September: Dulag transit camp for prisoners of war established by the Germans.
 1943–1944 - The Polish resistance movement facilitated escapes of Polish and British prisoners of war who fled from German POW camps via the city's port to neutral Sweden.
 1944 - Merkurlager 4-Am Lenzweg forced labour camp dissolved.

 1945
 May–June:  newspaper published.
 5 July: City becomes again part of Poland.
  becomes mayor.
 Szczecin Shipyard and National Museum, Szczecin established.
 1946
 Population: 72,948.
 1947 -  newspaper begins publication.
 1948
 Pogoń Szczecin, the city's most popular football club, founded.
 Szczecin Philharmonic founded.
 1956
 Mass raising of medical supplies and blood donation for the Hungarian Revolution of 1956 (see also Hungary–Poland relations).
 10 December: Protests against the Soviets and communist rule and in solidarity with Hungary. Protesters seized and demolished the Soviet consulate.
 1962 - 9 October: 1962 Szczecin military parade debacle.
 1966 - Arkonia Szczecin wins its first Polish Water Polo Championship.
 1970 - December: 1970 Polish protests.

 1972 - Roman Catholic diocese of Szczecin-Kamień established.
 1974 - Population: 360,500.
 1980
 August: .
 30 August: Szczecin Agreement signed, strike ends.
 1982 - August: Solidarity demonstration.
 1984 - University of Szczecin established.
 1985 - Morze Bałtyk Szczecin wins its first Polish volleyball championship.
 1987 - Visit of Pope John Paul II.
 1988 - August: Labor strike.
 1990 - Sister city partnership signed between Szczecin and Esbjerg, Denmark.
 1992 - Sister city partnership signed between Szczecin and St. Louis, United States.

21st century

 2001 -  (shipyard) active.
 2002 - Honorary Consulate of Estonia opened (see also Estonia–Poland relations).
 2006 -  becomes mayor.
 2007 - Monument to the victims of Nazi German forced labour camps in the Pomorzany neighbourhood unveiled by one of its survivors, Florian Nowacki.
 2011 - Szczecin hosts the 2011 European Short Course Swimming Championships.
 2012
 Jan Czekanowski monument unveiled.
 Population: 408,900.
 2014 - Szczecin Philharmonic Hall built.
 2016
 July: Monument to the victims of the Ponary massacre unveiled.
 December: Hungarian-funded "Boy of Pest" monument unveiled to commemorate the gratitude of Hungarians for Polish support of the Hungarian Revolution of 1956.
 2017 - Szczecin co-hosts the 2017 Men's European Volleyball Championship.
 2018 - Lech Kaczyński monument unveiled.
 2019
 February: Monument to the victims of Massacres of Poles in Volhynia and Eastern Galicia unveiled.
 April: Szczecin hosts the 2019 European Artistic Gymnastics Championships.
 2021
 September: Honorary Consulate of Luxembourg opened.
 October: Jerzy Popiełuszko monument unveiled.

See also
 History of Szczecin
 
 Etymology of Szczecin and Other names of Szczecin e.g. Stedyn, Stetin

References

This article incorporates information from the Polish Wikipedia and German Wikipedia.

Bibliography

in English
 
  (with details about Stettin)
 
 
 ***Please note that a wikilink to the article on [Stettin] in [EB1911] is not available***

in other languages

External links

 Links to fulltext city directories for Szczecin via Wikisource
 Digital Public Library of America. Items related to Szczecin, various dates

 
Szczecin
Szczecin
Years in Poland